Hyalobathra miniosalis is a moth in the family Crambidae. It was described by Achille Guenée in 1854. It is found in India, Indonesia (Java) and Australia, where it has been recorded from Queensland, the Northern Territory and Victoria.

Adults have yellow wings with dark orange zigzag lines.

Larva leaf roll and have been recorded eating Glochidion sp.

References

Moths described in 1854
Pyraustinae